Eysteinsson is a Scandinavian surname. Notable people with the surname include:

Halfdan Eysteinsson, the subject of Hálfdanar saga Eysteinssonar, a legendary saga from early 14th century Iceland
Rognvald Eysteinsson, founder of the Earldom of Orkney in the Norse Sagas
Sigtryg Eysteinsson, king of the Norwegian petty kingdoms Raumarike and Hedmark in the 9th century
Sigurd Eysteinsson (aka Sigurd the Mighty, ruled circa 875–892), the second Viking Earl of Orkney

See also
Estensan
Eysteinn